Pushpavalli is an Indian streaming television comedy drama series created by Sumukhi Suresh. It is an Amazon Prime Video original series and premiered on 15 December 2017.

Cast
 Sumukhi Suresh as Pushpavalli Parsuraman
 Manish Anand as Nikhil Rao
 Naveen Richard as Pankaj
 Ashok Pathak as T-Boy
 Preetika Chawla as Swati
 Latha Venkatraman as Amma
 Shraddha as Vasu
 Urooj Ashfaq as Tara
 Sumaira Shaikh as Srishti
 Niharika Dutt as Pearl
 Kaavya Bector as Bhavna
 Sonali Thakkar as Saloni
 Rahul Subramanian as Lakshman
 Kumar Varun as Guruji
 Gaurav Kapoor as Raghav
 Kenny Sebastian as Vinencio
 Manoj Kumar Kalaivanan as Sangameshwaran
 Yasmin Sait as Nikhil's Mom
 Breshna Khan as Rehna
 Sharin Bhatti as Gauri
 Rahul Hota as Doctor
 Pooja Sampath as Girl at the Stand-up
 Shyam Gopal as Nikhil's Father
 Harminder Singh Alag as Arhaan
 Veera Saxena as Nazia
 Vipul Mathur as The helmet guy
 Shreeja Chaturvedi as The pregnant girl
 Kavea Chavali as Pop up Mom
 Srikant Maski as Chengappa
 Vidyuth Gargi as Vidyuth

Episodes

Season 1 
</onlyinclude>

Season 2

Plot 

Season 2: The story continues with the premise of Pushpavalli's engagement with Vidyuth, a sweet, caring and considerate guy, who is Pushpavalli's mother's choice. The event is held in Bangalore where it is revealed that Pushpavalli wishes to take revenge on Nikhil for humiliating and rejecting her, enlisting T-Boy's help. She relocates to Bangalore on the pretext of spending time with her fiancé, and impressing his family, but ends up getting back her old job at Pankaj's library, where it is revealed that he and Swati are pursuing a relationship. She also starts living secretly in Vasu's PG, without the latter's knowledge, creating a new phase of challenges for her. The story continues as Pushpavalli furthers her saga of lies to regain Nikhil's trust and confidence in her, while simultaneously seeking vengeance and manoeuvring her oblivious fiancé and Pankaj away from her intentions.

References

Amazon Prime Video original programming
Hindi-language television shows
Indian television sitcoms
2017 Indian television series debuts
2017 Indian television series endings
Television shows set in Karnataka